Josef Středula (born 12 November 1967) is a Czech trade union activist. He became the chairman of the KOVO trade union in 2005. He left the office in 2014 to become the chairman of the Bohemian-Moravian Confederation of Trade Unions.

Early life and career
Středula was born in Opava in 1967. He studied at Technical High School and then worked at Vítkovice Ironworks. He has been a trade unionist since 1993. Středula affiliated himself with the KOVO Trade Union, and was elected chairman of the union in 2005. He left the office when he was elected chairman of the Bohemian-Moravian Confederation of Trade Unions. He was reelected in 2018.

2023 Presidential candidacy
He was asked about his possible presidential candidacy by A2larm magazine. He said it was possible he could run in the next Czech presidential election if he had the support of trade unions. His statement was positively received by trade unionists. Some politicians from the Czech Social Democratic Party (ČSSD) and Communist Party of Bohemia and Moravia, including Jan Hamáček and Jiří Dolejš, suggested possible support for Středula.

On 1 May 2022, the ČSSD youth organization, the Young Social Democrats, began collecting signatures for his candidacy. Four days later, he accepted the candidacy and announced it on his Twitter account, reiterating that he wanted to be a civic candidate. ČSSD has endorsed his candidacy.

Josef Středula was criticized by Czech journalist Lukáš Valenta over his use of a trade union demonstration as part of his campaign. Valenta also criticized Středula for his description of Ukraine as "the most corrupt country in the world". On 8 January 2023, Středula withdrew from the election and endorsed Danuše Nerudová.

References

1967 births
Living people
Czech trade unionists
People from Opava
Presidents of Bohemian-Moravian Confederation of Trade Unions
Candidates in the 2023 Czech presidential election
Czech Social Democratic Party presidential candidates